The Korea Rugby Union (KRU) is the governing body for rugby union in South Korea.

Teams
South Korea - the men's national rugby union team
7s - the national men's rugby union seven-a-side team.

See also
Rugby union in South Korea
Sport in South Korea

External links
Korea Rugby Union
Korea on irb.com
Korea on rugbydata.com

Rugby union in South Korea
Rugby union governing bodies in Asia
Rugby
Sports organizations established in 1948
1948 establishments in South Korea